Tauwhare is a small rural community in the Waikato District on the outskirts of Hamilton. The Waitakaruru Arboretum and Sculpture Park is located here. 

There is a Community Committee and a Memorial Hall.
The 1902 Cyclopedia of New Zealand noted that Tauwhare had a scattered population, a school, a cheese factory (owned by the New Zealand Loan and Mercantile Agency Company) and could be reached by coach from Tamahere railway station.

Demographics
These areas had the statistics in the table below, which show people are wealthier and slightly older than the 37.4 years of the national average. In 2013 Tauwhere was covered by meshblocks  0957700 and  0958200 with a population totalling 486 in 156 households.

In 2018 the main ethnic groups of the area were 89.4% European, 9.5% Māori and 5.3% Asian.

Marae

Te Iti o Hauā Marae is the mana whenua in Tauwhare of the local sub-tribe of the same name of Ngāti Hauā. The people here belong to the Mangaonua river. Waimakariri Marae and Waenganui meeting house is a meeting place for the Ngāti Hauā hapū of Ngāti Waenganui and Ngāti Waenganui, and the Waikato Tainui hapū of Ngāti Hauā.

In October 2020, the Government committed $734,311 from the Provincial Growth Fund to upgrade the marae and 4 other Ngāti Hauā marae, creating 7 jobs.

Education

References

Populated places in Waikato
Waikato District